The railway station of the hamlet of Brodhead's Bridge in Olive, New York was at milepost 18.1 on the Ulster and Delaware Railroad. It was a destination for tourists and vacationers from New York City who would stay at local resort homes (boarding houses) and use the nearby Esopus Creek to swim and fish. Similar resort villages named Atwood and Olive Bridge were also served by this station, which was abandoned in 1913 before it was submerged by the waters of the newly built Ashokan Reservoir.

References

Railway stations in the Catskill Mountains
Railway stations in the United States opened in 1869
Railway stations closed in 1913
Former Ulster and Delaware Railroad stations
1869 establishments in New York (state)
Railway stations in Ulster County, New York
Former railway stations in New York (state)
1913 disestablishments in New York (state)